Lance Carter Gooden (born December 1, 1982) is an American politician serving as the U.S. representative for Texas's 5th congressional district since 2019. His district includes parts of eastern Dallas, as well as a large swath of exurban and rural territory to Dallas's east.

A member of the Republican Party, Gooden previously served as the Texas State Representative for the 4th district (Henderson County and Kaufman County) from 2011 to 2015. He lost his reelection bid in the 2014 Republican primary election but was returned to office in the 2016 election for a non-consecutive third term in the state legislature before he ran for Congress.

Early life and education 
A native of Terrell in Kaufman County, an eastern suburb of Dallas, Gooden graduated from the University of Texas at Austin, from which he received a Bachelor of Arts in government in 2001 and a BBA in finance in 2004.

Texas House of Representatives 
In the 2010 primary election, Gooden won 50.5% of the vote, upsetting six-term incumbent Republican Representative Betty Brown. Gooden had formerly been Brown's legislative assistant.

Upon taking office in 2011, Gooden worked on the state budget in an attempt to eliminate wasteful spending. He served on the House Appropriations, County Affairs, and House Administration committees, the last of which handles employment by the House. In 2010, Gooden had no Democratic opponent in his heavily Republican district. In 2011, he assisted hotel mogul Monty Bennett in his fight against the Tarrant Regional Water District, pushing legislation to designate Bennett's 1,000-acre ranch as a municipal utility district and granting immunity from a proposed water pipeline through the property.

Gooden won renomination to a second term in the Republican primary held on May 29, 2012. He polled 6,385 votes (53.5%) to his opponent Stuart Spitzer's 5,545 (46.5%). Gooden was unopposed for a second term in the November 6 general election.

In 2016, Gooden staged a comeback and unseated Spitzer in the March 1 Republican primary, 14,500 votes (51.8%) to 13,502 (48.2%). He returned to the State House in January 2017.

U.S. House of Representatives

Elections

2018 

Gooden won the Republican nomination for the 5th congressional district and the November 6 general election, receiving 62.7% of the vote.

2020 

Gooden was reelected on November 3, receiving 62% of the vote.

Tenure

2020 election
In December 2020, Gooden was one of 126 Republican members of the House of Representatives to sign an amicus brief in support of Texas v. Pennsylvania, a lawsuit filed at the United States Supreme Court contesting the results of the 2020 presidential election, in which Joe Biden defeated incumbent Donald Trump. The Supreme Court declined to hear the case on the basis that Texas lacked standing under Article III of the Constitution to challenge the results of an election held by another state.

House Speaker Nancy Pelosi issued a statement that called signing the amicus brief an act of "election subversion." She also reprimanded Gooden and the other House members who supported the lawsuit: "The 126 Republican Members that signed onto this lawsuit brought dishonor to the House. Instead of upholding their oath to support and defend the Constitution, they chose to subvert the Constitution and undermine public trust in our sacred democratic institutions." New Jersey Democratic Representative Bill Pascrell, called for Pelosi to not seat Gooden and the other Republicans who signed onto the brief supporting the suit, arguing that "the text of the 14th Amendment expressly forbids Members of Congress from engaging in rebellion against the United States. Trying to overturn a democratic election and install a dictator seems like a pretty clear example of that."

Gooden voted against certifying the electors from Arizona and Pennsylvania in the 2020 United States presidential election and voted against the second impeachment of Donald Trump following the 2021 United States Capitol attack.

George Floyd Justice in Policing Act
On March 3, 2021, Gooden was the only House Republican to vote for the George Floyd Justice in Policing Act, which passed 220–212. Later that evening, he tweeted that he voted for the bill "accidentally", claiming he pushed the wrong button, a mistake he failed to notice in time. Gooden then tweeted that he had "arguably the most conservative/America First voting record in Congress", and "Of course I wouldn't support the radical left's, Anti-Police Act". According to Gooden, he had the official record changed to reflect his opposition.

Iraq
In June 2021, Gooden was one of 49 House Republicans to vote to repeal the Authorization for Use of Military Force Against Iraq Resolution of 2002.

Immigration
Gooden voted against the Further Consolidated Appropriations Act of 2020 which authorizes DHS to nearly double the available H-2B visas for the remainder of FY 2020.

LGBT rights
On July 19, 2022, Gooden did not vote for the Respect for Marriage Act, which would codify the right to same-sex marriage in federal law.

In August 2022, he co-sponsored a bill put forth by Marjorie Taylor Greene that would criminalize gender-affirming health care for trans youth.

Hong Kong 
In October 2022, Politico reported that Gooden criticized some US-based financial executives for attending the Global Financial Leaders' Investment Summit, saying: "The hypocrisy is staggering and every financial institution enabling China's atrocities should be ashamed."

Committee assignments 
Committee on Financial Services
Subcommittee on Housing, Community Development and Insurance (Vice Ranking Member)

Caucus membership 

 Republican Study Committee

Electoral history

Personal life 
On October 1, 2016, Gooden married Alexa Calligas, whose family is from Shreveport, Louisiana. They reside in Terrell with their two children.

Gooden grew up attending the Rockwall and Brin Church of Christ in Terrell, Texas, and remains a member of that congregation.

References

External links 
 Congressman Lance Gooden official U.S. House website
 Lance Gooden Election website
 Lance Gooden at the Texas Tribune
 
 

|-

|-

|-

1982 births
21st-century American politicians
Businesspeople from Texas
Christians from Texas
Living people
Republican Party members of the Texas House of Representatives
People from Terrell, Texas
American members of the Churches of Christ
Republican Party members of the United States House of Representatives from Texas
McCombs School of Business alumni